Flat Top Peninsula is a small, flat-topped peninsula  north of the south-western extremity of King George Island in the South Shetland Islands of Antarctica. The peninsula was named on a chart based upon a survey by Discovery Investigations personnel of the Discovery II during 1935.

References 

Peninsulas of King George Island (South Shetland Islands)